AA 2519 is an aluminium alloy principally containing copper (5.3–6.4%) as an alloying element. It also contains 0.25% silicon, 0.30% iron, 0.10–0.50% manganese, 0.05–0.40% magnesium, 0.10% zinc, 0.02–0.10% titanium, 0.05–0.15% vanadium, 0.10–0.25% zirconium, 0.40% silicon-iron compounds, and up to 0.15% trace elements. It was first registered in 1985, in the United States.

One application for this alloy is in aircraft armor, where it has equivalent ballistic characteristics to AA 7039, and a reduced susceptibility to stress corrosion cracking as compared to AA 5083.

AA 2519-T87 plate is weldable using AA 2319 filler.

Aluminium alloy table

References

Aluminium alloys
Aluminium–copper alloys